Frank Dyll was one of the five white professional baseball players to be the first to join the Negro American League. He was signed to the Chicago American Giants in 1950 by Ted "Double Duty" Radcliffe with the support of the team’s owner, Dr. J.B. Martin, who was concerned about black players joining Major League teams. The other four young white players were Lou Chirban, Lou Clarizio, Al Dubetts and Stanley Miarka.

See also
 List of Negro league baseball players

References

1929 births
1991 deaths
Chicago American Giants players
Baseball players from Chicago